Stevens Village Airport  is a state-owned public-use airport serving Stevens Village, in the Yukon-Koyukuk Census Area of the U.S. state of Alaska.

Facilities and aircraft 
Stevens Village Airport has one runway designated 5/23 with a gravel surface measuring 4,000 by 75 ft (1,219 x 23 m). For the 12-month period ending December 31, 2005, the airport had 750 aircraft operations, an average of 62 per month: 67% general aviation and 33% air taxi.

Airlines and destinations

References

External links 
 
 
 

Airports in the Yukon–Koyukuk Census Area, Alaska